Harald Hein (19 April 1950 – 20 May 2008) was a German foil fencer. He won a gold medal in the team event at the 1976 and a silver in the same event at the 1984 Summer Olympics.

Biography
Harald Hein attended the Kaufmännische Schule Tauberbischofsheim and fought for the Fencing-Club Tauberbischofsheim.

References

External links
 

1950 births
2008 deaths
People from Tauberbischofsheim
Sportspeople from Stuttgart (region)
German male fencers
Olympic fencers of West Germany
Fencers at the 1972 Summer Olympics
Fencers at the 1976 Summer Olympics
Fencers at the 1984 Summer Olympics
Olympic gold medalists for West Germany
Olympic silver medalists for West Germany
Olympic medalists in fencing
Medalists at the 1976 Summer Olympics
Medalists at the 1984 Summer Olympics